Hermine Blangy (c. 1820–c. 1865) was a French ballet dancer in the Paris Opéra. In 1840 she danced the title role of La Sylphide there. She was also prima ballerina for the Hofoper in Vienna, and danced on tour in the USA. Blangy's first appearance in America was at Niblo's Garden in July 1846, as Calista in Vengeance of Diana. Noah Miller Ludlow reports that "this artist gave unqualified satisfaction in all of her performances, and was unquestionably a fine pantomimist as well as dancer."

In 1847 Blangy's Giselle at the St. Charles Theater in New Orleans was so popular that she danced it ten times in a fortnight, to "crowded houses and enthusiastic applause". Her last US performance of that tour was in New Orleans in 1847, after which she left for Europe. Blangy returned to the US in 1849 to dance at The Broadway Theatre.

References

19th-century births
19th-century deaths
Paris Opera Ballet étoiles
Prima ballerinas
Year of birth missing
Place of birth missing
19th-century French ballet dancers